Philippine Ports Authority is a government-owned and controlled corporation under the Department of Transportation as an attached agency.  It is responsible for financing, management and operations of public ports throughout the Philippines, except the port of Cebu, which is under the Cebu Ports Authority.

History
Prior to the creation of PPA, port administration in the Philippines was merged with the traditional function of revenue collection of the Bureau of Customs (BOC). Port and harbor maintenance was the responsibility of the Bureau of Public Works (BPW). In the early 1970s, there were already 591 natiot planning, development, operations and regulation at the national level. Around this time, the Bureau of Customs had proposed to the Reorganization Committee and to Congress the creation of a separate government agency to integrate the functions of port operations, cargo handling and port development and maintenance to enable the Bureau to concentrate on tax and customs duties collection. Moreover, manage the country's ports. Hence, the Philippine Ports Authority was created under Presidential Decree No. 505 which was subsequently amended by P.D. No. 857 in December 1975. The latter decree broadened the scope and functions of the PPA to facilitate the implementation of an integrated program for the planning, development, financing, operation and maintenance of ports or port districts for the entire country. In 1978, the charter was further amended by Executive Order No. 513 the salient features of which were the granting of police authority to the PPA, the creation of a National Ports Advisory Council (NPAC) to strengthen cooperation between the government and the private sector, and the empowering of the Authority to exact reasonable administrative fines for specific violations of its rules and regulations. By virtue of its charter, the PPA was attached to what was then the Department of Public Works and Highways's responsibility. The executive order also granted PPA financial autonomy.

Just compensation award

On August 24, 2007, the Philippine Supreme Court (per 24-page decision by Angelina Sandoval-Gutierrez), ordered the PPA to pay 231 residents of Batangas City the just compensation sum of P6 billion as payment of 185 lots it bought in 2001 for the construction of Phase 2 of the Batangas Port Zone. On September 6, 2007, the Supreme Court of the Philippines ordered status quo on PPA expropriation in Batangas (of 1,298,340 square meters of land to be used for the development of Phase II of the Batangas City port).
Batangas and Subic ports served as extensions of the Port of Manila in order to ease congestion, President Benigno S.C. Aquino III has ordered Through Executive Order (EO) No. 172 signed Sep 13, Mr. Aquino declared the two ports as extensions of Manila International Container Terminal and South Harbor, citing the need "to immediately and effectively address existing port congestion and avert further damaging effects to the country’s economy, and also to put in place a mechanism that will immediately address future similar situations..."

"It is hereby declared that whenever there is congestion in the Port of Manila, or in case of emergency situations affecting public interest such as, but not limited to, strikes or lock-outs and natural calamities, resulting in serious disruptions in port operations, designated ports in Batangas International Port and the Port of Subic, and specifically the Subic Bay Freeport shall be considered as extensions of the Port of Manila," the executive order states.

Under EO 172, facilities in the Batangas International Port and the Port of Subic Bay, and specifically the Subic Bay Freeport—to be identified by the Philippine Ports Authority (PPA) and the Subic Bay Metropolitan Authority (SBMA) – shall be deemed extensions of the Port of Manila, upon declaration by the Transportation Secretary of the existence of port congestion or emergencies, to be recommended by PPA.

"Foreign vessels with Port of Manila as the port of destination or origin may be directed to berth either at the Port of Batangas or Subic Bay Freeport... the berthing in said ports shall be considered as berthing at the Port of Manila."

See also
Transportation in the Philippines
Strong Republic Nautical Highway
List of ports in the Philippines

References

External links

PPA Homepage

Department of Transportation (Philippines)
Port authorities
Government-owned and controlled corporations of the Philippines
Philippine Ports Authority
Organizations based in Manila
1975 establishments in the Philippines
Establishments by Philippine presidential decree